Qarah Kand or Qareh Kand may refer to various places in Iran:
 Qarah Kand, Charuymaq, East Azerbaijan Province
 Qarah Kand, Maragheh, East Azerbaijan Province
 Qareh Kand-e Khotb, Maragheh County, East Azerbaijan Province
 Qareh Kand-e Musavi, Maragheh County, East Azerbaijan Province
 Qarah Kand, Asadabad, Hamadan Province
 Qarah Kand, Razan, Hamadan Province
 Qareh Kand, West Azerbaijan